Chongzun Expressway (Simplified Chinese:崇遵高速公路, Traditional Chinese:崇遵高速公路) connects Chongxihe, Tongzi County and Zunyi City in the Chinese province of Guizhou. It is part of Lanhai Expressway.

Expressways in China
Transport in Guizhou